Brigadier General Tupou Tongapoʻuli Aleamotuʻa (born 1966), also known as Lord Fielakepa, is a Tongan soldier and noble. He has served as Chief of Staff of His Majesty's Armed Forces since 21 December 2014. From April 2021 to May 2022 he served as Acting Commissioner for the Tongan Police.

From October 2011 to May 2012 he commanded Tonga's third contingent to Afghanistan and was stationed at Camp Bastion.

In 2015 Aleamotuʻa was appointed to the title of Lord Fielakepa by King Tupou VI in 2015 following the death of his older brother of Sosaia Tupou Aleamotuʻa. The appointment was challenged by his nephew Tupou Tongaliuaki Filoʻaulo Aleamotuʻa, and in December 2015 the Land Court ruled in the latter's favour. The decision was upheld by the Privy Council of Tonga in August 2016.

Aleamotuʻa is a member of the Privy Council of Tonga.

References

1966 births
Tongan nobles
Tongan military personnel
Military personnel of the War in Afghanistan (2001–2021)
Living people